The Agriculture Minister of Belgium is the political minister office responsible for agriculture. In 2001, the Regions became mainly responsible for agriculture as part of the fifth state reform.

List of ministers

Federal government
Ministers in the Belgian Federal Government:
 1981-1992 : Paul De Keersmaecker (CVP)
 1992-1995 : André Bourgeois (CVP)
 1995-1999 : Karel Pinxten (CVP)
 1999 : Herman Van Rompuy (CVP)
 1999-2001 : Jaak Gabriëls (VLD)
 2001-2003 : Annemie Neyts (VLD)
 2003-2014: Sabine Laruelle (MR)
 2014-2017: Willy Borsus (MR)
 2017-Present: Denis Ducarme (MR)

Flanders
Ministers in the Flemish Government:
 1995-1999 : Eric Van Rompuy (Christian People's Party, CVP)
 1999-2003 : Vera Dua (Groen!)
 2003-2004 : Ludo Sannen (Groen!)
 2004 : Jef Tavernier (Groen!)
 2004-2007 : Yves Leterme (Christian Democratic and Flemish, CD&V)
 2007-2014 : Kris Peeters (CD&V)
 2014 - present : Joke Schauvliege (CD&V)

Wallonia
Ministers in the Walloon Government:
 1985-1988 : Daniel Ducarme (Liberal Reformist Party, PRL)
 1988-1992 : Guy Lutgen (Christian Social Party, PSC)
 1992-1995 : Guy Lutgen (Christian Social Party, PSC)
 1995-1999 : Guy Lutgen (Christian Social Party, PSC)
 1999-2004 : José Happart (Socialist Party, PS)
 2004-2009 : Benoît Lutgen (Humanist Democratic Centre, CDH)
 2009-2011 : Benoît Lutgen (Humanist Democratic Centre, CDH)
 2011-2014 : Carlo Di Antonio (Humanist Democratic Centre, CDH)
 2014- : René Collin (Humanist Democratic Centre, CDH)

Agriculture